Bjørn Pedersen (born 25 March 1933) is a Norwegian chemist. He has been research leader at SI (which later merged with SINTEF), and was professor of chemistry at the University of Oslo for 24 years. He also served three years as pro-rector at the university.

Career
Born in Vestre Aker, Pedersen graduated as dr.philos. from the University of Oslo in 1964, and subsequently worked as researcher and eventually research leader for Sentralinstitutt for industriell forskning (SI). From 1979 to 2003 he was appointed professor in chemistry at the University of Oslo. His research included contributions to solid-state chemistry, and the fields of electron paramagnetic resonance spectroscopy and nuclear magnetic resonance spectroscopy.

From 1985 to 1988 he assumed the position of pro-rector at the University of Oslo. As writer he issued the textbook Generell kjemi in 1998.

Pedersen received honorable doctorship at Uppsala University in 1989, and became
honorary member of the Norwegian Chemical Society in 2014.

Selected works

References

1933 births
Living people
Scientists from Oslo
Norwegian chemists
University of Oslo alumni
Academic staff of the University of Oslo
Norwegian textbook writers